Goodbye, Norma Jean is a 1976 film by Larry Buchanan based on the life of Marilyn Monroe. Misty Rowe plays the title role.

Cast
 Misty Rowe as Norma Jeane Baker
 Terence Locke as Ralph Johnson
 Patch Mackenzie as Ruth Latimer
 Preston Hanson as Hal James
 Marty Zagon as Irving Oblach
 Andre Phillippe as Sam Dunn
 Adele Claire as Beverly
 Sal Ponti as Randy Palmer
 Paula Mitchell as Cynthia Palmer
 Jean Sarah Frost as Ethel
 Lilyan McBride as House Mother
 Burr Middleson as Sleazy Photographer
 Stuart Lancaster as George
 Ivy Bethune as Ruby Kirshner
 Robert Gribbon as Terry

References

External links

1976 films
Films about Marilyn Monroe
Films directed by Larry Buchanan
1970s English-language films